William S. Yellow Robe Jr. (February 4, 1960 – July 19, 2021) was an Assiniboine actor, author, director, educator, playwright, and poet.

Life and career
A member of the Assiniboine and Sioux Tribes of the Fort Peck Indian Reservation, Yellow Robe was raised by his mother on the Fort Peck Indian Reservation in Montana. He studied writing and performing arts at the University of Montana.

Yellow Robe's works have been performed in venues across the United States, including the Penumbra Theatre Company in St. Paul; the Public Theater in New York;  the Trinity Repertory Company in Providence, RI; and the Smithsonian's National Museum of the American Indian in Washington, D.C. He was a member of Penumbra, as well as the Ensemble Studio Theater, Amerinda, Inc., and the advisory board for Red Eagle Soaring Native Youth Theatre.
  
Yellow Robe has also taught at the Institute of American Indian Arts, Brown University,  and the University of Maine.

He died following a long illness in Bangor on July 19, 2021. The day after he died, Yellow Robe was named the recipient of a $40,000 award in recognition of his contributions to theatre. His papers joined the many playwright and poetry archives at the Harry Ransom Center at The University of Texas at Austin in 2022 and are available there for research.

Awards
New England Theater Conference Special Award winner (2004)
New York Community Trust Helen Merril Award for Playwrighting (2021), announced one day after Yellow Robe died.

Bibliography

The Body Guards. ASIN: B014613HLM
The Burning of Uncle. *from Learner, A. (Ed.). (1990). Dancing on the rim of the world: an anthology of contemporary Northwest native American writing. Tucson: University of Arizona Press. 
The Council. ASIN: B014617O4S
Independence of Eddie Rose. ASIN: B00LLPCN1C *from Mojica, M. and Knowles, R. (Eds.). (2003). Staging coyote's dream: an anthology of First Nations drama in English. Toronto: Playwrights Canada Press. 
Restless Spirits: plays. Albany: State University of New York Press, [2020]. 
Rez Politics. ASIN: B0146168YK
Sneaky. ASIN: B014619D42
The Star Quilter. ASIN: B01461109S

Notes

Further reading

External links 

 William S. Yellow Robe Jr. Papers at the Harry Ransom Center
 Faculty Profile at the University of Maine
 Bill Yellow Robe Spoke Native Truth to White Power by Rhiana Yazzie at American Theatre

1960 births
2021 deaths
20th-century American poets
20th-century American dramatists and playwrights
20th-century American male writers
20th-century American male actors
20th-century Native Americans
21st-century American poets
21st-century American dramatists and playwrights
21st-century American male writers
21st-century American male actors
21st-century Native Americans
American male dramatists and playwrights
American male poets
Assiniboine people
Brown University faculty
Institute of American Indian Arts faculty
Male actors from Montana
Native American dramatists and playwrights
Native American male actors
Native American poets
People from Poplar, Montana
University of Maine faculty
University of Montana alumni
Writers from Montana